Observations & Reflections is a studio album by jazz fusion drummer Billy Cobham, released in 1982 on the Elektra/Musician label. The album rose to No. 25 on the Billboard Top Jazz LPs chart.

Overview
Observations & Reflections was produced by Billy Cobham.

Covers
Cobham covered "Take It To The Sky" by Earth, Wind & Fire which came off the band's 1980 album Faces.

Critical reception

The album was released to favorable reviews, and continued to gain momentum through the years.

Tracklisting

Side One

Side Two

References

1982 albums
Billy Cobham albums
Elektra Records albums